Statler and Waldorf are a pair of Muppet characters best known for their cantankerous opinions and shared penchant for heckling. The two elderly men first appeared in The Muppet Show in 1975, where they consistently jeered the entirety of the cast and their performances from their balcony seats.

Created by Jim Henson, the characters have been performed by numerous puppeteers, including Henson, in a variety of films and television productions within the Muppet franchise. Statler and Waldorf are named after two landmark New York City hotels, the Statler Hilton and the Waldorf-Astoria.

Characters
The characters are known for their heckling. In The Muppet Show, the two are always criticizing Fozzie Bear's humor, except for one occasion where Fozzie heckles them back. In contrast, they find themselves vastly entertaining and inevitably burst into mutual laughter at their own witticisms. It is later revealed in the A Muppet Family Christmas special that the two hecklers are friends with Fozzie's mother, Emily Bear. Despite constantly complaining about the show and how terrible some acts are, they always return for the following week and occupy their usual pair of seats in the balcony. Their reasons for doing so are a mystery even to them, according to one version of the Muppet Show theme (Waldorf: "Why do we always come here?" / Statler: "I guess we'll never know").

They also have a predisposition for breaking the fourth wall. Author Ben Underwood remarked on how the characters generally "blur the boundary between performer and audience", as they are "concurrently audience members and performers". Underwood points to a second season incident in which the characters see themselves watching the Muppets, with Statler skeptical, saying "No one would watch junk like that".

History

The puppets were designed by Bonnie Erickson. They were named after two historic New York City hotels, the Statler Hilton and the Waldorf-Astoria.

In "Sex and Violence", the pilot episode of The Muppet Show, Statler and Waldorf were performed by Jerry Nelson and Jim Henson, respectively. Nelson was unavailable for the first few weeks of production on The Muppet Show. As a result, Richard Hunt took on the role of Statler. Hunt and Henson would continue to perform the two characters until Henson's death in 1990. To portray the characters, Hunt and Henson shared very close space, often for hours at a time.

Beginning with The Muppet Christmas Carol (1992), Statler and Waldorf were performed by Jerry Nelson and Dave Goelz, respectively. When Jerry Nelson left the Muppets, citing health reasons, Muppeteer Steve Whitmire took over as Statler. The two were occasionally performed by Drew Massey (Statler) and Victor Yerrid (Waldorf) in 2005 and 2006, most notably in the web series Statler and Waldorf: From the Balcony. Kevin Clash filled in for Goelz as Waldorf in a few episodes of Muppets Tonight.

In 2017, Whitmire departed from the Muppets franchise, including the part of Statler, after being unwillingly dismissed from the part of Kermit the Frog in October 2016. While Matt Vogel was announced for the replacement for Kermit, Peter Linz had already replaced Whitmire as the voice of Statler in advertisements.

Appearances
Statler and Waldorf also appeared (as adults) in the Saturday morning animated television series Muppet Babies. Both characters were voiced by Dave Coulier.

In The Muppet Christmas Carol, they played the ghosts of Jacob and Robert Marley. Whereas the novel A Christmas Carol features only a Jacob Marley, creating a Robert allowed for including the two Muppets, and possibly also references Bob Marley. When Ebenezer Scrooge, played by Michael Caine, accuses them of always criticizing him, they reply "We were always heckling you." In Muppet Treasure Island, they were the figureheads of the Hispaniola. Statler complains about being stuck on the front of the ship, to which Waldorf replies it is better than being in the audience.

In the 1996 series Muppets Tonight, based on a television rather than theatre show, Statler and Waldorf were shown watching the show at an assisted living facility, still making disparaging remarks. The duo are featured characters at Disney's Muppet*Vision 3D at Disney's Hollywood Studios as audio-animatronic Muppets helping Bean Bunny escape the theater and, of course, heckling the show. They also make a cameo appearance in Pixar's 2008 short film Presto, where they can be seen in their theater box.

The Muppet Newsflash: A Jim Henson News Blog announced on September 17, 2009, that Statler and Waldorf would release a book titled From the Balcony in 2010. However, the book was never released.

Statler and Waldorf appear in featured roles in The Muppets film. They are shown in Kermit's old office where they inform evil oil baron, Tex Richman, that the only thing that could stop his purchase of The Muppet Theater would be Kermit raising $10 million. They appear during one scene of the 2014 sequel Muppets Most Wanted. When the Muppets arrive in Berlin to perform at a run-down cabaret theater, marked by a sign reading "Die Muppets" ("The Muppets" in German), the two joke as to whether this is an early review or a suggestion. This scene is presented in the "Statler and Waldorf Cut" of the film in its home video release.

They appear as audience members in The Muppets TV series. The episode "Pig Out" features a B-plot focusing on Statler without Waldorf. They also appear on Muppets Now.

From the Balcony

Statler and Waldorf: From the Balcony is a multi-award–winning web show which ran biweekly on Movies.com from June 2005 until September 2006. The series spawned more than 35 episodes and featured many Muppet characters, both well-known classics and newly created characters. The two elderly curmudgeons would discuss upcoming films, watch the latest movie trailers and share the week's "balconism" from their theater box.

Guest appearances
Both made an appearance in Marvel Team-Up #74. In this issue, Spider-Man teams up with the cast of Saturday Night Live to battle the Silver Samurai. Statler and Waldorf appear in typical style as hecklers on a balcony.
They appear at the end of Weezer's video for the song "'Keep Fishin'". They comment that the performance wasn't half bad, before adding that it was all bad.
On the song "The Black Hole" by HORSE the band, the track ends with Statler and Waldorf celebrating the song and then talking themselves into decrying it as "terrible".
On September 18, 2009, Statler and Waldorf were shown in a routine on The Tonight Show with Conan O'Brien called "Statler and Waldorf Heckle Obama", consisting of a video recording of President Barack Obama at a health care rally, with old Muppet Show clips of Statler and Waldorf interspersed within it.
Statler and Waldorf are feature characters in the 2011 movie The Muppets. To promote the film, they also appeared with several other Muppets on the 2011 Halloween episode of WWE Raw, with the duo offering their usual commentary from a skybox.
The pair make occasional cameos in Family Guy, such as heckling Lost after Peter builds a balcony in his living room ("Petergeist") or a cutaway where Statler is shown without Waldorf and realises he enjoys the show without "the other guy" there to egg him on ("Jerome is the New Black").
The pair also appeared "via satellite" as BFCA critics at the 2012 Critics' Choice Movie Awards on January 12, 2012.
Statler and Waldorf appeared several times from the balcony to critique the performers at The Secret Policeman's Ball 2012 at Radio City Music Hall in New York City on March 4, 2012.

Reception
In The Guardian, Hadley Freeman wrote "Not even celebrity guest Milton Berle could compete with their sharp banter. My heroes". In 2014, Esquires Nick Schager named them one of The 10 Most Entertaining Fictional Critics, writing "the funniest Muppets characters have always been Statler and Waldorf". In 2015, The Huffington Post identified Statler and Waldorf as popular Muppets, and said to the fans who love them above others, "You know the best way to cope with life's difficulties is by laughing at someone else's expense".

Commentators sometimes make comparisons between people and Statler and Waldorf in attention to, or preoccupation with, details, "loud" opinion, or "cantankerous" personality. In 2012, Der Spiegel described the United Kingdom as "at best spectators in the gallery, like Statler and Waldorf", within Europe, drawing the ire of British media.

References

Bibliography
 
 
 
 
 
 
 
 

American comedy duos
Fictional bullies
Fictional characters who break the fourth wall
Fictional duos
Television characters introduced in 1975
Television duos
The Muppets characters